Foundation Day is an annual public holiday in Norfolk Island commemorating the arrival of the original British settlers on 6 March 1788.

Background
Because the United States stopped accepting convicts from Britain after gaining independence, Britain needed new penal colonies.  London thus commissioned Captain Arthur Phillip to head a group of 11 ships, known as the First Fleet, to do just that and establish a new penal colony in New South Wales.

After the First Fleet's landing in New South Wales, Captain Phillip instructed Lieutenant Philip Gidley King to take a small team of convicts and free men to colonise Norfolk Island. They reached the uninhabited island on 6 March 1788.

Celebration
Each year on Foundation Day, local residents gather at the beach in Kingston and re-enact the arrival of the First Fleeters.  They put on costumes to dress up as British sailors and row boats.

References

Norfolk Island culture
Public holidays in Australia